Antoniuk is a surname. Notable people with the name include the following:

Dan Antoniuk (born 1981), American footballer
Jeff Antoniuk (born 1965), Canadian saxophonist
Nina Antoniuk, the maiden name of Nina Preobrazhenskaya
Maksim Antoniuk (1895 – 1961), Belarusian general
John Antoniuk (born 1939), RCAF

See also

Antonik
Antoniu
Antonius
Antonyuk

Patronymic surnames